The 1995 King Fahd Cup was the second and last tournament held under the King Fahd Cup name before the competition was retroactively sanctioned by FIFA and recognized as FIFA Confederations Cup. Disputed as the King Fahd Cup, in honor of the then Saudi ruler who organized the tournament with his country's federation (thus in the form of an unofficial tournament), it was hosted by Saudi Arabia in January 1995. It was won by Denmark, who beat defending champions Argentina 2–0 in the final.

Qualified teams

Venue
All matches were played at the 67,000-capacity King Fahd II Stadium in Riyadh, Saudi Arabia.

Match referees
Africa
 Lim Kee Chong
Asia
 Ali Bujsaim
Europe
 Ion Crăciunescu
North America, Central America and Caribbean
 Rodrigo Badilla
South America
 Salvador Imperatore

Squads

Group stage

Group A

Group B

Third place play-off

Final

The 1995 King Fahd Cup Final was held at King Fahd II Stadium, Riyadh, Saudi Arabia on 13 January 1995. The match was contested by Denmark and the title holders, Argentina. Denmark won their first King Fahd Cup/Confederations Cup title.

Statistics

Goalscorers
With three goals, Luis García was the top scorer in the tournament. In total, 19 goals were scored by 14 different players, with none of them credited as an own goal.

3 goals
 Luis García

2 goals

 Gabriel Batistuta
 Peter Rasmussen
 Daniel Amokachi

1 goal

 José Chamot
 Ariel Ortega
 Sebastián Rambert
 Brian Laudrup
 Michael Laudrup
 Morten Wieghorst
 Kazuyoshi Miura
 Ramón Ramírez
 Mutiu Adepoju
 Emmanuel Amunike

Tournament ranking

References

RSSSF

External links

Intercontinental Championship Saudi Arabia 1995, FIFA.com

 
1995
King Fahd Cup 1995
King Fahd Cup
King Fahd Cup
King Fahd Cup
King Fahd Cup
King Fahd Cup
King Fahd Cup
January 1995 sports events in Asia
1995 in association football